Azouzetta Lake, elevation 876m (2,874 ft), is a lake in the Hart Ranges of the Northern Rockies of British Columbia.  The lake is situated adjacent the Pine Le Moray Provincial Park.

The lake has been referred by different names within historical documents, from Summit Lake in 1870–80, to Pollen Lake in 1907 and finally Azzouzetta (Summit Lake) in 1917.

References 

Lakes of British Columbia
Canadian Rockies
Cariboo Land District